The Society and Technology Institute was from 2000 until 2013 a Flemish institute. The institute was associated with the Flemish Parliament, for which it provided advice on complex issues involving society and technology. 

Until 2008 it was called the Flemish Institute for Scientific and Technological Aspect research (viWTA).

The Flemish Parliament abolished the institute per 1 January 2013. The technology assessment function and several employees were transferred to the Flemish Institute for Technological Research.

See also
 Belgian Academy Council of Applied Sciences
 Flemish Council for Science and Innovation (VRWI)
 Flemish Institute for Technological Research (VITO)
 Science and technology in Flanders

External links
 Official website

Science and technology in Belgium